Alexander Strehmel (born 20 March 1968) is a German football manager and a former professional player who played as a defender or midfielder. He managed Michigan Stars FC.

Playing career
Strehmel began his career with VfB Stuttgart, and broke into the first team during the 1986–87 season, in which he made sixteen appearances in the Bundesliga. He continued to play steadily over the next few years, and helped the club to the 1989 UEFA Cup Final, although he missed the entire second half of the 1988–89 season, including final itself (a defeat against Napoli). Three years later came the greatest success of Strehmel's career as  Stuttgart won the Bundesliga title. He made 25 appearances during the season, as the club overhauled Eintracht Frankfurt and Borussia Dortmund with a 4–2 win over the latter on the last day of the season to become German champions. Strehmel played in the match as a late substitute for Andreas Buck, with the score at 3–1.

By the 1993–94 season, Strehmel was used less frequently (only thirteen appearances), so he left Stuttgart in July 1994, after over 150 league appearances for the club. He signed for SG Wattenscheid 09 of the 2. Bundesliga, where he spent two seasons, the second of which saw the club relegated in last place. Strehmel stayed in the second tier, though, signing for SpVgg Unterhaching.

In the 1998–99 season, Unterhaching finished in second place, earning promotion to the Bundesliga, where they would spend the next two seasons. The first season they finished a very respectable tenth, and were involved in another dramatic title race - their 2–0 win over Bayer Leverkusen on the last day of the season handing the German championship to their neighbours Bayern Munich. However, Unterhaching finished 16th the following season, and this relegation was followed by another - they finished 15th in the 2. Bundesliga and were relegated to the Regionalliga Süd. They immediately bounced back as champions, before Strehmel left the club midway through the 2003–04 season, returning to the Regionalliga Süd to join FC Augsburg. He retired from football at the end of the 2004–05 season, after only eight appearances in eighteen months for Augsburg.

International career
Strehmel was part of the West Germany under-20 team that went to the 1987 FIFA World Youth Championship in Chile. He played in all six matches as West Germany reached the final, scoring once in a group game against Saudi Arabia. He also scored a penalty in the shoot-out in the final against Yugoslavia, but West Germany lost 5–4. Strehmel also won 8 caps for the under-21 team between 1988 and 1990.

Coaching career
Since retiring from football, Strehmel has been a coach, usually working as assistant to Lorenz-Günther Köstner, who had been his manager at SpVgg Unterhaching. The pair have worked at Rot-Weiss Essen, TSG 1899 Hoffenheim, and VfL Wolfsburg II.

He became coach at Michigan Stars FC of the National Independent Soccer Association, the US third tier.

Honours
VfB Stuttgart
 UEFA Cup finalist: 1989
 Bundesliga: 1992

References

External links

1968 births
Living people
People from Hann. Münden
Association football defenders
Association football midfielders
German footballers
Germany youth international footballers
Germany under-21 international footballers
VfB Stuttgart players
SG Wattenscheid 09 players
SpVgg Unterhaching players
FC Augsburg players
Bundesliga players
2. Bundesliga players
German football managers
National Independent Soccer Association coaches
German expatriate football managers
German expatriate sportspeople in the United States
Expatriate soccer managers in the United States
Footballers from Lower Saxony